Gázszer Futball Club was a Hungarian football club from the town of Gárdony.

History
Gázszer Futball Club debuted in the 1997–98 season of the Hungarian League and finished eighth.

Name Changes
1994–1995: Gázszer Futball Club
1995–?: Gázszer Futball Club-Agárd
?-1999: Gázszer Futball Club
2000: went bankrupt and was replaced by Pécsi MFC in the 1999-2000 Nemzeti Bajnokság I

External links
 Profile

References

Football clubs in Hungary
Defunct football clubs in Hungary
1909 establishments in Hungary